Casomera is one of 18 parishes (administrative divisions)  in Aller, a municipality within the province and autonomous community of Asturias, in northern Spain. 

Villages
 El Vao
 El Casarón
 Casomera
 Cuḷḷá las Piedras
 Felgueras
 Foceya
 El Goxal
 L'Intrueyo
 La Moradieḷḷa
 Los Morriondos
 Ruayer
 Rumañón
 La Paraya
 Vescayana
 Viḷḷar
 Yananzanes

References

Parishes in Aller